In 2020 heavy clashes between ex-Séléka groups erupted in N'Délé in Central African Republic. Fighting was largely along ethnic lines between Rounga factions of FPRC and ethnically Goula and Kara rebel groups.

History 
On 2 March 2020 FPRC fighters killed an RPRC colonel. FPRC refused to execute their fighters who were responsible for this attack. Two days later heavy clashes erupted between both groups in N'Délé leading to several people being killed and injured. On 5 March both sides received reinforcement from Birao and surrounding villages. At 5 am clashes were reported 5 km from N'Délé. Thousands of refugees mainly from Goula ethnic groups began to gather at MINUSCA base near airport. On 7 March 2020 MINUSCA staff member was killed in N'Délé during clashes. RPRC was forced to withdraw from N'Délé and prefect of Bamingui fled the city. His residence was occupied by FPRC. On 8 March six alleged members of FPRC were murdered by RPRC. Number of refugees reached 3,000. On 9 March around 100 members of MLCJ arrived from Vakaga to reinforce RPRC positions. On 11 March RPRC with support of MLCJ attacked FPRC positions in N'Délé seizing half of city and looting and burning central market and FPRC leader residence. More than 40 civilians were killed. 

On 18 March it was reported that FPRC controlled Ndélé while RPRC controlled surrounding villages. On 25 March RPRC attacked Gozbéda village 7 km from Ndélé destroying homes. FPRC reinforcement clashed with them leading to three FPRC and seven RPRC fighters being killed. On 28 March more than 60 fighters reinforced RPRC positions. Day later fighting has reached outskirts of Ndélé. On 30 March armed FPRC fighters forced refugees to leave IDP camp.

On 1 April 2020 clashes erupted between Goula and Rounga factions of FPRC in Bornou neighborhood of N'Délé. Soldiers demanded resignation of FPRC chief, Moctar Adam. On 6 April fighting resumed with blasts being heard in the city. RPRC coalition attacked N'Délé from four sides. On 15 April UN reported that situation started to improve after FPRC chief returned to city. However, on 29 April RPRC and MLCJ attacked central market in N'Délé killing at least 37 people After attack RPRC withdrew towards Artisanat, Mourouba, Sodeca and Mbatta neighborhoods which were abandoned by civilian population. They established their base in local church and captured two technicals which were later destroyed according to FPRC. On 10 May Rwandan and Portuguese peacekeepers arrived in the city to force RPRC fighters to leave the city. On 12 May clashes between FPRC and RPRC erupted again in a village 2 km from Ndélé after alleged act of robbery by FPRC fighters leading to four fighters and two civilians being killed.

Aftermath 
On 13 May 2020 FACA was deployed in N'Délé in the former base of FPRC for the first time since 2012.

On 19 May MINUSCA arrested nine RPRC fighters in N'Délé including general Azor Kalité while they were trying to escape to Tirigoulou. They were transferred two days later to Bangui. They have been accused of war crimes and crimes against humanity. On 25 May MINUSCA arrested two RPRC fighters 16 km from N'Délé followed by another two day later including general Amar.

On 27 August pact of non-aggression in Bamingui-Bangoran was signed between Goula and Rounga factions of FPRC.

References 

Central African Republic Civil War
March 2020 events in Africa
2020 in the Central African Republic
Battles involving Portugal
Conflicts in 2020